Thunder Road Films is a film and television financing and production company founded by Basil Iwanyk. It is based in Santa Monica, California.

Management 
Producer Basil Iwanyk founded the film and television financing and production company Thunder Road Films in the mid 2000s. In January 2012, Peter Lawson left The Weinstein Company to join Thunder Road as a President of Production, and then left in January 2014 for a job as exec VP of production and acquisitions at Open Road Films. As of October 2014, Jonathan Fuhrman is Thunder Road's Executive Vice President (EVP) of Business Affairs.

Collaboration deals 
In July 2011, after leaving Warner Bros. Television, Thunder Road signed a first-look deal with Sony Pictures Television to develop television projects.

In May 2013, Thunder Road signed on a deal with Cutting Edge Group to finance the company's film music slate, and from that the first film getting covered was John Wick.

In June 2014, Thunder Road and Christian Angermayer's Film House Germany signed a deal to strengthen Thunder Road's financial capability to develop projects. In October 2014, Thunder Road and PalmStar Media signed on a deal in which the Thunder Road would receive $200 million annually to finance five to six $20–50 million budgeted indies within a year. It would also enable the company to co-finance the development and production of larger studio projects.

In May 2015, Thunder Road renewed its slate agreement with Cutting Edge Group and its investment arm, Conduct, which finances the music budgets of films and television programs in exchange for IP rights to each project's original music.

In September 2020, Thunder Road teamed with Redbox on joint venture Asbury Park Pictures for the purpose of making 12 films over the next three years. The films we be budgeted in the range of $10 million-$12 million, and be distributed via Redbox kiosks and on demand service.

Production 
Thunder Road has been producing films since 2006, which included 2006's Firewall and We Are Marshall, 2009's Brooklyn's Finest, 2010's Clash of the Titans and The Town. The company also produced the three installments of The Expendables series. Clash of the Titans' sequel Wrath of the Titans was also produced by the company which released in 2012.

Filmography

Film 
 2006: Firewall
 2006: We Are Marshall
 2008: Lost Boys: The Tribe
 2009: Brooklyn's Finest
 2010: Clash of the Titans
 2010: The Town
 2010: Lost Boys: The Thirst
 2012: Wrath of the Titans
 2014: John Wick
 2014: Seventh Son
 2015: Sicario
 2016: Gods of Egypt
 2017: John Wick: Chapter 2
 2017: Wind River
 2017: The Current War
 2017: 24 Hours to Live
 2018: Sicario: Day of the Soldado
 2018: Hotel Mumbai
 2018: A Private War
 2018: Robin Hood
 2019: John Wick: Chapter 3 – Parabellum
 2019:  The Informer 
 2020: Endless
 2020: Bruised
 2020: Greenland
 2021: Voyagers
 2021: National Champions
 2022: The Contractor
 2022: Monkey Man
 2022: Black Site

Upcoming 
 2023: Love Again
 2023: John Wick: Chapter 4
 2024: John Wick: Chapter 5
 TBA: Ballerina
 TBA: Kandahar
 TBA: Wind River: The Next Chapter

Television 
 2015: The Messengers
 2020: The Fugitive

References 

 
2000 establishments in California
American companies established in 2000
Mass media companies established in 2000
Film production companies of the United States
Television production companies of the United States
Companies based in Santa Monica, California